Roberto Ruspoli (born 27 July 1972) is an Italian painter.

Television 
2005 - 2012 Cortesie per gli ospiti, Sky; Real Time
2013 - Fuori Menù, Real Time

Books
L'educazione vi prego sull'amore e altri consigli per vivere bene, 2010, Kowalski

References

External links
Fuori Menù

Living people
1972 births
Italian television presenters